Locke Township is one of fourteen townships in Rowan County, North Carolina, United States. The township had a population of 12,401 according to the 2000 census.

Geographically, Locke Township occupies  in central Rowan County.  The only incorporated municipality here is a portion of the city of  Salisbury, the county seat of Rowan County.

Townships in Rowan County, North Carolina
Townships in North Carolina